Four Seasons Hotel New York is a luxury hotel in Midtown Manhattan, New York City, that opened in 1993. The hotel is owned by Ty Warner Hotels and Resorts, L.L.C. and operated by Four Seasons Hotels and Resorts. It was closed temporarily in 2020.

Prior to the hotel's closing, the Ty Warner Penthouse Suite was frequently listed among the world's most expensive hotel suites.

History
In the 1980s, William Zeckendorf, a prominent American real estate developer, assembled  of vacant property on 57th Street between Madison Avenue and Park Avenue. Robert H. Burns, founder of Regent International Hotels, approached Harunori Takahashi, owner of EIE International Corporation company to build a luxurious hotel on the property.

When the hotel was announced in January 1989, it was to have a main tower of 46 stories and a smaller tower of some 20 stories, with a total of 400 rooms. Completion was planned for late 1991. Construction was financed by a loan from a consortium of six Japanese banks, led by the Long-Term Credit Bank. The others were the Ashikaga Bank, Mitsubishi Trust and Banking Corporation, Mitsui Trust and Banking Company, Nippon Credit Bank, and Sumitomo Trust and Banking Company.  The hotel was named Regent New York Hotel and managed by Regent International Hotels of Hong Kong, in which EIE International had a 30 percent interest. The cost of construction was reportedly more than US$1 million per room.

After the Japanese real estate market imploded in 1990, Four Seasons Hotels, Inc. purchased a 20 percent stake in Regent International for $122. The 1992 deal included the Four Seasons in New York, which was then under construction. The other 80 percent was retained by Regent's parent company, the E.I.E. International Corporation. In 1996, the Lai Sun Group purchased the Four Seasons New York from Long-Term Credit Bank of Japan, which assumed ownership when E.I.E. International encountered financial difficulties. In 1999, Lai Sun sold the building to a private investment group headed by Ty Warner for $275 million. Today, the hotel is owned by Ty Warner Hotels and Resorts, L.L.C. and operated by Four Seasons.

The luxury hotel stopped booking paying guests in March 2020 at the onset of the COVID-19 pandemic, instead offering free housing for medical professionals. The hotel closed in July 2020 for what the hotel said was "substantial infrastructure and maintenance work" that it expected to last "well into 2023." Several publications reported that the closing is actually the result of a dispute between owner Ty Warner and Four Seasons Hotels and Resorts over management fees.

Architecture
In 2006, the Four Seasons New York opened the Michelin star restaurant: L'Atelier de Joël Robuchon.

The hotel is noted for its luxurious interiors which have an art moderne quality. I. M. Pei and Frank Williams collaborated as the architects. I. M. Pei was also the responsible for the interiors of the public spaces in the hotel. The building has more in common with the Waldorf Astoria and other hotels of the 1920s than it does with Pei's other works. Rosenwasser/Grossman Consulting Engineers provided the structural engineering and Jaros, Baum & Bolles was the MEP engineer on the project.

See also
Four Seasons Hotels
List of tallest buildings in New York City

References

External links

Design notices
in-Arch.net: The Four Seasons Hotel

Four Seasons hotels and resorts
Hotels in Manhattan
I. M. Pei buildings
Midtown Manhattan
Skyscraper hotels in Manhattan
Skyscrapers on 57th Street (Manhattan)
Hotel buildings completed in 1993
1993 establishments in New York City